The Kaqchikel (also called Kachiquel) are one of the indigenous Maya peoples of the midwestern highlands in Guatemala.  They constitute Guatemala's third largest Maya group. The name was formerly spelled in various other ways, including Cakchiquel, Kakchiquel, Caqchikel, and Cachiquel.

In Postclassic Maya times the capital of the main branch of the Kaqchikel was Iximché. Like the neighboring K'iche' (Quiché), they were governed by four lords: Tzotzil, Xahil, Tucuché and Acajal, who were responsible for the administrative, military and religious affairs. The Kakchikel recorded their history in the book Annals of the Cakchiquels, also known as Memorial de Sololá.

The Chajoma were another Kaqchikel-speaking people; the ruins of Mixco Viejo have been identified as their capital.

Iximché was conquered by the Spanish conquistador Pedro de Alvarado in 1524. At that time, the Kaqchikel were the enemies of the neighbouring K'iche' Kingdom, and helped the Spaniards to conquer it. The first colonial capital of Guatemala, Tecpán Guatemala, was founded near Iximché on July 25, 1524. On November 22, 1527, after several Kaqchikel uprisings, the capital was moved to Ciudad Vieja, near Antigua Guatemala.

The Kaqchikel language, one of the Mayan languages, is spoken today by 400,000 people. They are largely subsistence farmers, and their culture reflects a fusion of Maya and Spanish influences.

See also
Our Elders Teach Us

References

Maya peoples of Guatemala
 
Chimaltenango Department
Guatemala Department
Sacatepéquez Department
Sololá Department